Charanjit Singh may refer to:

 Charanjit Singh (cricketer) (born 1978), Indian cricketer
 Charanjit Singh (hockey player) (1931–2022), Indian field hockey player
 Charanjit Singh (musician) (1940–2015), Indian musician

Politicians 
 Dr. Charanjit Singh, Indian politician, Punjab MLA and eye surgeon
 Charanjit Singh Atwal (born 1937), Indian politician who was Deputy Speaker of the 14th Lok Sabha of India from 2004 to 2009
 Charanjit Singh Channi (born 1963), Indian politician and the former Chief Minister of Punjab
 Charanjit Singh Walia (c. 1935–2013), Indian politician who was elected to the Lok Sabha